Kang Kyung-ho (born September 9, 1987), often anglicized Kyung Ho Kang, is a South Korean mixed martial artist who competes in the UFC's bantamweight division.

Career
Kang started his professional career in 2007. He fought mainly for international promotions, such as Spirit Martial Challenge, Art of War and DEEP.

Road Fighting Championship
Kang faced Shoko Sato in the quarterfinal match of ROAD FC bantamweight tournament on March 24, 2012 at Road FC 7. He won via submission due to an armbar in the second round.

In the semifinal on June 16, 2012 at Road FC 8, Kang faced Jae Hoon Moon. He won via submission due to a rear-naked choke in the second round. On the same day, Kang faced Andrew Leone in the final. Once again Kang won via submission due to a rear-naked choke in round two and was crowned the first-ever Road FC bantamweight champion.

In July 2012, it was announced that Kang had signed a contract to compete in the Bantamweight division of the Ultimate Fighting Championship.

Ultimate Fighting Championship
Kang was expected to face Alex Caceres on November 10, 2012 at UFC on Fuel TV: Franklin vs. Le. However, Kang was removed from the event due to injury and was replaced by promotional newcomer Motonobu Tezuka.

Kang/Caceres finally took place on March 3, 2013 at UFC on Fuel TV: Silva vs. Stann. Caceres originally won the fight via split decision, but the result was later changed to a no contest after Caceres tested positive for marijuana.

Kang faced Chico Camus on August 31, 2013 at UFC 164. He lost the fight via unanimous decision (29–28, 29–28, 30–27).

Kang faced Shunichi Shimizu on January 4, 2014 at UFC Fight Night: Saffiedine vs. Lim. He won the fight via submission due to an arm-triangle choke in the third round.

Kang was expected to face Chris Holdsworth on May 24, 2014 at UFC 173.  However, Kang pulled out of the bout and was replaced by Chico Camus.

Kang faced Michinori Tanaka on September 20, 2014 at UFC Fight Night 52. He won the fight via split decision, and both fighters would earn Fight of the Night honors for their efforts.

Kang put a hold on his career to serve his two-year commitment for mandatory South Korean military service. In December 2017 he returned from hiatus to face Guido Cannetti on January 14, 2018 at UFC Fight Night: Stephens vs. Choi. He won the fight via submission in the first round.

Kang faced Ricardo Ramos on August 4, 2018 at UFC 227. He lost the fight by split decision.

Kang faced Teruto Ishihara on February 10, 2019 at UFC 234. He won the fight via a submission in round one.

Kang faced Brandon Davis on August 17, 2019 at UFC 241. He won the fight via split decision.

Kang faced Liu Pingyuan on December 21, 2019 at UFC on ESPN+ 23. He won the fight via split decision.

Kang was scheduled to face Rani Yahya on July 31, 2021 at UFC on ESPN 28.  However the bout was cancelled a few hours before happening due to Yahya testing positive for COVID-19.

Kang faced Rani Yahya on November 20, 2021 at UFC Fight Night 198. He lost the bout via unanimous decision.

Kang was scheduled to face Saimon Oliveira on June 11, 2022, at UFC 275. However, Oliveira withdrew from the event for unknown reasons and he was replaced by Danaa Batgerel. He won the bout via unanimous decision.

Championships and accomplishments

Mixed martial arts
 ROAD Fighting Championship
 ROAD FC bantamweight title (one time)
 ROAD FC bantamweight tournament winner (2012)
 Spirit Martial Challenge
 Go! Super-Korean season three winner
 Ultimate Fighting Championship
 Fight of the Night (One time) vs. Michinori Tanaka

Mixed martial arts record

|Win
|align=center|
|Danaa Batgerel
|Decision (unanimous)
|UFC 275
|
|align=center|3
|align=center|5:00
|Kallang, Singapore
|
|-
|Loss
|align=center|17–9 (1)
|Rani Yahya
|Decision (unanimous)
|UFC Fight Night: Vieira vs. Tate
|
|align=center|3
|align=center|5:00
|Las Vegas, Nevada, United States
|
|-
|Win
|align=center|17–8 (1)
|Liu Pingyuan
|Decision (split)
|UFC Fight Night: Edgar vs. The Korean Zombie 
|
|align=center|3
|align=center|5:00
|Busan, South Korea
|   
|-
|Win
|align=center|16–8 (1)
|Brandon Davis
|Decision (split)
|UFC 241 
|
|align=center|3
|align=center|5:00
|Anaheim, California, United States
|
|-
|Win
|align=center|15–8 (1)
|Teruto Ishihara
|Technical Submission (rear-naked choke)
|UFC 234
|
|align=center|1
|align=center|3:59
|Melbourne, Australia 
|
|-
|Loss
|align=center| 14–8 (1)
|Ricardo Ramos
|Decision (split)
|UFC 227 
|
|align=center|3
|align=center|5:00
|Los Angeles, California, United States
|
|-
|Win
|align=center| 14–7 (1)
|Guido Cannetti
|Submission (triangle choke)
|UFC Fight Night: Stephens vs. Choi
|
|align=center|1
|align=center|4:53
|St. Louis, Missouri, United States
|
|-
| Win
| align=center | 13–7 (1)
| Michinori Tanaka
| Decision (split)
| UFC Fight Night: Hunt vs. Nelson
| 
| align=center | 3
| align=center | 5:00
| Saitama, Japan
| 
|-
| Win
| align=center | 12–7 (1)
| Shunichi Shimizu
| Submission (arm-triangle choke)
| UFC Fight Night: Saffiedine vs. Lim
| 
| align=center | 3
| align=center | 3:53
| Marina Bay, Singapore
|
|-
| Loss
| align=center | 11–7 (1)
| Chico Camus
| Decision (unanimous)
| UFC 164
| 
| align=center | 3
| align=center | 5:00
| Milwaukee, Wisconsin, United States
|
|-
| NC
| align=center | 11–6 (1)
| Alex Caceres
| NC (overturned)
| UFC on Fuel TV: Silva vs. Stann
| 
| align=center | 3
| align=center | 5:00
| Saitama, Japan
| 
|-
| Win
| align=center | 11–6
| Andrew Leone
| Submission (rear-naked choke)
|rowspan=2| Road FC 8: Bitter Rivals
|rowspan=2| 
| align=center | 2
| align=center | 1:19
|rowspan=2| Wonju, South Korea
| 
|-
| Win
| align=center | 10–6
| Jae Hoon Moon
| Submission (rear-naked choke)
| align=center | 2
| align=center | 4:27
| 
|-
| Win
| align=center | 9–6
| Shoko Sato
| Submission (armbar)
| Road FC 7: Recharged
| 
| align=center | 2
| align=center | 2:38
| Seoul, South Korea
| 
|-
| Loss
| align=center | 8–6
| Andrew Leone
| Technical Decision
| Road FC 6: The Final Four
| 
| align=center | 3
| align=center | 5:00
| Seoul, South Korea
| 
|-
| Win
| align=center | 8–5
| Min Jung Song
| Submission (armbar)
| Road FC 5: Night of Champions
| 
| align=center | 1
| align=center | 4:55
| Seoul, South Korea
|
|-
| Win
| align=center | 7–5
| Kil Woo Lee
| TKO (corner stoppage)
| Road FC 3: Explosion
| 
| align=center | 1
| align=center | 0:52
| Seoul, South Korea
| 
|-
| Loss
| align=center | 6–5
| Bae Young Kwon
| Submission (triangle armbar)
| Road FC 2: Alive
| 
| align=center | 1
| align=center | 4:05
| Seoul, South Korea
|
|-
| Win
| align=center | 6–4
| Kazutoshi Fujita
| Submission (rear-naked choke)
| Grachan 5
| 
| align=center | 1
| align=center | 2:10
| Tokyo, Japan
|
|-
| Loss
| align=center | 5–4
| Munehiro Kin
| DQ (knee to downed opponent)
| Gladiator 11: G–1
| 
| align=center | 1
| align=center | 4:56
| Tokyo, Japan
|
|-
| Win
| align=center | 5–3
| Makoto Kamaya
| Submission (rear-naked choke)
| KOF: The Beginning of Legend
| 
| align=center | 3
| align=center | 4:19
| Jinju, South Korea
|
|-
| Loss
| align=center | 4–3
| Shigeki Osawa
| Decision (unanimous)
| World Victory Road Presents: Sengoku Raiden Championships 12
| 
| align=center | 3
| align=center | 5:00
| Tokyo, Japan
|
|-
| Loss
| align=center | 4–2
| Atsushi Yamamoto
| Decision (unanimous)
| Deep: Fan Thanksgiving Festival 2
| 
| align=center | 2
| align=center | 5:00
| Tokyo, Japan
|
|-
| Win
| align=center | 4–1
| Ning Guangyou
| Submission (triangle choke)
| AOW 13: Rising Force
| 
| align=center | 1
| align=center | 7:34
| Beijing, China
| 
|-
| Win
| align=center | 3–1
| Nam Sun Kim
| TKO (doctor stoppage)
| Spirit MC 17: All In
| 
| align=center | 1
| align=center | 4:08
| Seoul, South Korea
|
|-
| Loss
| align=center | 2–1
| Kwang Hee Lee
| KO (soccer kicks)
| Spirit MC 14: Karma
| 
| align=center | 1
| align=center | 2:45
| Seoul, South Korea
| 
|-
| Win
| align=center | 2–0
| Duk Young Jang
| Submission (triangle choke)
| Spirit MC 13: Heavyweight GP Final
| 
| align=center | 1
| align=center | 2:45
| Seoul, South Korea
|
|-
| Win
| align=center | 1–0
| Jae Hyun So
| Decision (unanimous)
| Spirit MC 11: Invasion
| 
| align=center | 2
| align=center | 5:00
| Seoul, South Korea
|

Filmography

Television show

See also
 List of current UFC fighters
 List of male mixed martial artists

References

External links
 
 

1987 births
Living people
Sportspeople from Busan
South Korean male taekwondo practitioners
South Korean ssireum practitioners
South Korean practitioners of Brazilian jiu-jitsu
South Korean male mixed martial artists
Bantamweight mixed martial artists
Mixed martial artists utilizing taekwondo
Mixed martial artists utilizing Ssireum
Mixed martial artists utilizing Brazilian jiu-jitsu
Road Fighting Championship champions
Ultimate Fighting Championship male fighters